Fonte means fountain, source and/or spring in several languages, and is thus present in many toponyms and titles. It may also refer to:

People
 Allison Fonte (born 1964), American actress and pianist
 Artur Fonte (born 1959), Portuguese football player
 Bartholomew de Fonte, Spanish admiral involved in the early knowledge of the Pacific Northwest
 César Fonte (born 1986), Portuguese cyclist
 Emanuele Fonte (born 1992), Italian football player
 Francesco Fonte (born 1965), Italian football player
 Jeanne de la Fonte, birth name of Renée Adorée (1898–1933), French actress
 John Fonte, philosopher involved in transnational progressivism
 José Fonte (born 1983), Portuguese football player
 Marcello Fonte (born 1978), Italian actor
 Maria Inês Fonte (born 2002), Portuguese tennis player
 Mike da Fonte (born 1991), American football player
 Moderata Fonte (1555–1592), Venetian writer and poet
 Pedro José de Fonte y Hernández Miravete (1777–1839), Mexican archbishop
 Rui Fonte (born 1990), Portuguese football player

Places
 Fonte, Veneto, Treviso, Italy
 Fonte River, Guam
 Fonte Boa, Amazonas, Brazil

See also